Kent Wheeler Kennan (April 18, 1913, Milwaukee, Wisconsin – November 1, 2003, Austin, Texas) was an American composer, author, educator, and professor.

He learned to play the organ and the piano and received degrees in composition and music theory from the University of Michigan and the Eastman School of Music. At the age of 23, he was awarded the Rome Prize, which allowed him to study for three years in Europe, primarily at the American Academy in Rome. He was the half brother of the diplomat and historian George F. Kennan.

For most of his career, Kennan was a professor at the University of Texas at Austin, also teaching briefly at Kent State University. His work as a professor was briefly interrupted by World War II, when he served as a bandmaster for the United States Army. Upon his release, he taught for two years (1947-1949) at Ohio State University before returning to the University of Texas.

His compositions include works for orchestra, chamber ensemble and solo instrument as well as songs and choral music. His Sonata for Trumpet and Piano is part of the standard repertoire for many collegiate trumpet studios. His Night Soliloquy was written in 1936 and is set for solo flute, piano and strings. Kennan composed his last major work in 1956 at the age of 43 and largely abandoned composition, writing only occasional small pieces and devoting himself to teaching and educational writing.

His books Counterpoint and The Technique of Orchestration have been widely used as classroom texts.

On May 5, 1957, Howard Hanson and the Eastman-Rochester Orchestra recorded Kennan's Three Pieces for Orchestra, a work composed in Rome in 1936 and premiered in 1939 by Hanson and the Rochester orchestra.  It was released by Mercury Records on LP (SR90147) and CD (434307-2).  The three movements are "Promenade," "Nocturne," and "Il Campo dei Fiori".

On December 30, 2003, Kent Kennan: Chamber Music was released by Pierian on CD (0017). Featuring Felicity Coltman on piano, with the Austin Chamber Music Center, the album includes "Sonata for Violin and Piano," composed 1937, "Night Soliloquy," composed 1936, "Scherzo, Aria and Fugato for Oboe and Piano," composed 1949, "Threnody for Violin and Piano," composed 1992, and "Quintet for Piano and Strings," composed 1935. These last two tracks, "Threnody" and "Quintet" were performed in the presence of the composer.  Austin Chamber Music ensemble performers included Richard Kilmer, violin, Megan Meisenbach, flute, Kathleen Turner, oboe, Adrianna Hulscher, violin, Jennifer Bourianoff, violin, Ames Asbell, viola, and Margaret Coltman-Smith, cello.

Books
Kennan, Kent. The Technique of Orchestration. New Jersey: Prentice-Hall, 1952, 1970, 1983, 1990, 1996, 2002. . . .
Kennan, Kent. Counterpoint. New Jersey: Prentice-Hall, 1987.
. .

References

External links
Interview with Kent Kennan, March 29, 1987
Bryce Jordan Collection of Kent Kennan at the Harry Ransom Center

Recordings
Giuseppe Galante - Kent Kennan: Sonata for Trumpet and Piano: I. With strength and vigor
Giuseppe Galante - Kent Kennan: Sonata for Trumpet and Piano: II. Rather slowly and with freedom
Giuseppe Galante - Kent Kennan: Sonata for Trumpet and Piano: III. Moderately fast, with energy

20th-century classical composers
1913 births
2003 deaths
American male classical composers
American classical composers
Kent State University faculty
Ohio State University faculty
Musicians from Milwaukee
Musicians from Austin, Texas
University of Michigan School of Music, Theatre & Dance alumni
20th-century American composers
University of Texas at Austin faculty
Classical musicians from Texas
Classical musicians from Wisconsin
20th-century American male musicians